The 2019 CONMEBOL Libertadores de Beach Soccer was the fourth edition of the Copa Libertadores de Beach Soccer (known natively in Spanish as the Copa Libertadores de Futbol Playa), an annual continental beach soccer club tournament contested primarily between the champions of the domestic leagues of South American nations who are members of CONMEBOL.

The tournament took place in Luque, Paraguay, between 14 and 21 September 2019, and was organised by CONMEBOL in cooperation with the host association, the Paraguayan Football Association (APF). It was originally scheduled to take place from 13–20 October 2019 but a change of dates was announced on 13 June.

Brazilians Vitória were the defending champions but were eliminated at the group stage, ultimately finishing 10th. The title was won by fellow Brazilian club Vasco da Gama, who claimed their third title at the fourth attempt.

Format
As per Regulations Article 15, the competition format consists of two phases: the Preliminary phase (Group phase) and the Final phase.

Teams
Twelve teams qualified to take part; each of the domestic league champions (or champions of specific Copa Libertadores qualification tournaments) from the ten South American nations which are members of CONMEBOL, plus an additional club from the host country and the defending champions.

Notes

Venue

One venue was used in the city of Luque, Gran Asunción.
All matches took place at the Estadio de Fútbol de Playa, newly built to primarily host the 2019 FIFA Beach Soccer World Cup, located on the grounds of the Paraguayan Olympic Committee with a capacity of 3,150.

Squads
 
Each team had to submit a squad of 12 players, including a minimum of two goalkeepers (Regulations Article 31).

Draw
The draw to split the twelve teams into three groups of four took place on 20 August 2019 at 12:00 PYT (UTC–3) in Luque, Paraguay at the headquarters of the Paraguayan Football Association. The draw was conducted based on Regulations Article 16 as follows:

Initially, three teams were seeded and assigned to the head of the groups (Vitória automatically to Group A, the others via a draw from pot 1):  

To Group A: as 2018 Copa Libertadores champions,  Vitória
To Group B: as the club of the runner-up national association of the 2018 Copa Libertadores,  Vasco da Gama
To Group C: as champions of the host association,  San Bernardino

The remaining nine teams were split into three pots of three based on the final placement of their national association's club in the previous edition of the championship, with the highest three (Argentina, Uruguay and Bolivia) placed in Pot 2, the next three (Colombia, Peru and Chile) placed in Pot 3 and the lowest two (Venezuela and Ecuador) in pot 4, alongside the additional Paraguayan club. From each pot, the first team drawn was placed into Group A, the second team drawn placed into Group B and the final team drawn placed into Group C. Clubs from the same association could not be drawn into the same group.

The draw resulted in the following groups:

Group stage
Each team earns three points for a win in regulation time, two points for a win in extra time, one point for a win in a penalty shoot-out, and no points for a defeat. The top two teams of each group, plus the two best ranked third-placed teams, advance to the quarter-finals.

Tie-breakers 
If two or more teams are equal on points, their rankings are determined as follows (Regulations Article 21):
 Goal difference in the matches played between the teams concerned;
 Number of goals scored in the matches played between the teams concerned;
 Goal difference in all group matches;
 Number of goals scored in all group matches;
 Drawing of lots by CONMEBOL.

All times are local, PYT (UTC–3).

Group A

Group B

Group C

Ranking of third-placed teams

As per Regulations Article 17, it was decided the third place teams would take the following berths in the quarter-final draw:

9th–12th place play-offs
The worst third placed team plays the best fourth placed team for 9th place; the second best fourth placed team plays the worst fourth placed team for 11th place.

11th place match

9th place match

Knockout stage

Quarter-finals

Semi-finals

5th–8th place

1st–4th place

Finals

7th place match

5th place match

3rd place match

Final

Final standings

Notes

References

External links
CONMEBOL Libertadores de Fútbol Playa Paraguay 2019, at CONMEBOL.com (in Spanish)
CONMEBOL Libertadores Paraguay 2019, at Paraguayan Football Association (in Spanish)
CONMEBOL Libertadores de Fútbol Playa Paraguay 2019 , at Beach Soccer Worldwide

2019
Copa
2019
2019 in beach soccer
Copa Libertadores de Beach Soccer
2019 in South American football